He Touched Me is the seventeenth studio album by American singer and musician Elvis Presley, released on April 1, 1972. A contemporary gospel music album, it earned him his second of three Grammy Awards. The album was his third and final studio gospel album, and the most contemporary of the three. He Touched Me was certified Gold on March 27, 1992 and Platinum on July 15, 1999 by the RIAA.

Track listings

Original LP release

2008 CD Reissue

Follow That Dream edition

Personnel

Elvis Presley – arranger, vocals
The Imperials – vocals
David Briggs – organ, piano
James Burton – guitar
Kenny Buttrey – drums
Jerry Carrigan – drums
Joe Esposito – guitar
Charlie Hodge – guitar
Ginger Holladay – vocals
Mary Holladay – backing vocals on "Amazing Grace"
Millie Kirkham – vocals
Kathy Westmoreland - vocals
Charlie McCoy – organ, piano
Sonja Montgomery – vocals
Joe Moscheo – organ, piano
June Page – vocals
Norbert Putnam – bass guitar
Temple Riser – vocals
Chip Young – guitar
The Nashville Edition - backing vocals on "Amazing Grace"

Technical
Felton Jarvis – producer
Al Pachucki – engineer

Certifications

References

External links

Elvis Presley albums
1972 albums
Albums produced by Felton Jarvis
RCA Records albums
RCA Victor albums
Gospel albums by American artists
Contemporary Christian music albums by American artists